Wampur is a minor Austronesian language of Madang Province, Papua New Guinea. It is spoken in the two villages of Wampur and Mirir in Onga-Waffa Rural LLG.

References

Markham languages
Languages of Madang Province